was a Japanese geologist.

Career
Miyashiro was known for his contributions to metamorphic and igneous petrology. He also made contributions to the study of tectonics and meteorites. In the 1960s he introduced the concept of paired metamorphic belts. In 1973 Miyashiro challenged the common conceptions of ophiolites and proposed an island arc origin for the famous Troodos Ophiolite in Cyprus. This was done arguing that numerous lavas and dykes in the ophiolite had calc-alkaline chemistries.

Personal life and death
Miyashiro was a native of Okayama Prefecture. On the evening of 22 July 2008, Miyashiro visited a state park west of Albany, NY and remained there to take sunset pictures while his wife waited by the parking area. Police discovered his body at the base of a cliff on the 24th.

References

2008 deaths
Japanese geologists
Academic staff of the University of Tokyo
Columbia University faculty
Petrologists
Tectonicists
People from Okayama Prefecture